Julio is a best-of compilation album by Julio Iglesias. It was released in 1983 on CBS. The album covers the period from 1981 to 1983. According to the Guinness World Records, Julio is the first foreign language album to sell more than two million in the United States.

It contains songs in multiple languages.

Reception 
In the United States Julio peaked at number 32 on the Billboard 200 chart for the week of May 21, 1983. On August 17, 1984, it was certified platinum by the Recording Industry Association of America (RIAA) for shipments of one million copies in the country.

Track listing

Charts

Certifications

References 

1983 compilation albums
Julio Iglesias albums
Columbia Records compilation albums